Homoeosoma albosparsum is a moth of the family Pyralidae described by Arthur Gardiner Butler in 1881. It is endemic to the Hawaiian islands of Kauai, Oahu, Maui and Hawaii.

The larvae feed on the flowers of Wilkesia gymnoxiphium but do not injure the seeds. When there are no more flowers to feed on, the nearly grown larvae bore into the stem and feed on the pith, which occupies a considerable portion of the stem. The cocoons are formed within the hollowed-out stem. Some of the larvae shortly transform to pupae and then adult moths, while others remain larvae for a long time within the cocoon and probably are able
to wait for the next blossoming season.

External links

Moths described in 1881
Phycitini
Endemic moths of Hawaii